Gandy is a surname. Notable persons with that surname include:

 Andrew Jackson Gandy (1924–1942), American naval seaman
 Antonio Gandy-Golden (born 1998), American football player
 Bruce Gandy (born 1962), Canadian bagpipe player
 Charles Gandy (1872–1943), French physician
 Christopher Henry Gandy (1867–1907), British cricketer
 David Gandy (born 1980), British male model
 Dylan Gandy (born 1982), American football player
 Edythe Evelyn Gandy (1920–2007), American politician
 Ellen Gandy (born 1991), British swimmer
 George Gandy (1851–1946), American entrepreneur
 Harry Luther Gandy (1881–1957), American politician
 Helen Gandy (1897–1988), American civil servant
 Ida Gandy (1885–1977), English social worker and author, mother of Robin
 James Gandy (1619–1689), British portrait painter
 John Manuel Gandy (1870–1947), American college president
 John Peter Gandy aka John Deering (1787–1850), British architect
 Joseph Edward Gandy (1847–1934), American politician
 Joseph Michael Gandy (1771–1843), British artist
 Kim Gandy (born 1954), American feminist activist
 Martha Gandy Fales (1930–2006), American art historian and curator
 Matthew Gandy (born 1965), British urbanist and professor of geography
 Michael Gandy (architect) (1778–1862), British architect
 Michael Gandy (cricketer) (born 1944), Australian cricketer
 Mike Gandy (born 1979), American football player
 Oscar H. Gandy Jr. (born c.1944), American professor of communication studies
 Peter Gandy (born 1961), Australian athlete
 Peter Gandy (author), British writer on religious topics
 Robert Brinkley 'Bob' Gandy (1893–1945), American baseball player
 Robin Gandy (1919–1995), British mathematical logician
 Sam Gandy, American professor researching amyloid
 Stephanie Gandy (born 1982), British American basketball player
 Tanya Gandy (born 1987), American water polo player
 Wayne Gandy (born 1971), American football player
 William Gandy (died 1729), British portrait painter

See also
 Gandhi (surname)
 Gandy (disambiguation)
 Ghandy (surname)

Surnames from nicknames
Occupational surnames